Hades 360 is a wooden roller coaster at Mt. Olympus Water & Theme Park in Wisconsin Dells, Wisconsin. When it opened in 2005, the coaster was known as Hades; it was renamed in 2013 when the 360 degree roll was installed. It is the largest roller coaster in the park. Hades 360 is a rarity among wooden roller coasters due to its 360 degree roll, 110-degree over banked turn, and steep 65-degree drop as well as its 90-degree banked turn, as drops and angles this steep are generally not included on wooden roller coasters due to structural limitations. The ride was designed by The Gravity Group.

History
Hades opened on May 14, 2005. The ride was also renamed Hades 360 and received a new Timberliner train. Two rows had to be added in the station to accommodate the new 12 row train that replaced the former 10 row train.

Awards
In its debut year in 2005, Hades 360 was voted "Best New Ride" by Amusement Today magazine. In every year except 2020, the ride has also been ranked among the top 50 wooden roller coasters in the Golden Ticket Awards.

See also
 2013 in amusement parks

References

Roller coasters introduced in 2005
Roller coasters in Wisconsin
Best New Ride winners